Dyfnwal may refer to:

 Dyfnwal Hen (fl. 6th century), King of Alt Clut
 Dyfnwal, King of Strathclyde (died 908-915)
 Dyfnwal ab Owain (died 975), King of Strathclyde

See also
Dumnagual (disambiguation)